Half-maximal concentration can refer to either of the following:

 EC50 - half-maximal effective concentration
 IC50 - half-maximal inhibitory concentration